Igreja do Espírito Santo is a church in Portugal. It is classified as a National Monument.

See also
 List of Jesuit sites

Espirito Santo
National monuments in Évora District